In architecture, the latin term opus ("work") is a word that generically indicates various techniques of constructing buildings that were in use in ancient Rome. Usually, the word opus is not used alone in building descriptions, but is paired with specific attributes whose purpose is to show precisely the building technique that was used (i.e., opus africanum, opus craticum, opus emplectum, opus gallicum, opus incertum, opus isodomum, opus latericium, opus mixtum, opus quadratum, opus reticulatum, opus vittatum, etc.).

See also 
 Roman concrete
 Roman architecture

Roman construction techniques
Ancient Roman architecture
Masonry
Ancient inventions
Architecture in Italy
Architectural history